Snowy Owl is an engraving by naturalist and painter John James Audubon. It was printed full size and is an early illustration of a snowy owl and part of The Birds of America. It was first published as part of a series in sections around 1831. The same book includes images of six now-extinct birds. Art historians describe the quality of Audubon's work as being high and printed with "artistic finesse".

The plant life backgrounds of this engraving were done by Audubon's assistants and Joseph Mason but they are not credited in the book. The piece was created by shooting the owls and then painting them after Audubon set them into poses. He then directed the production of the printing plate based upon his painting. Audubon included details on the bird itself in his Ornithological Biographies. The Snowy Owl engraving was made by Robert Havell. The original prints were printed on J. Whatman watermarked paper. The border of the image is labelled "Snowy Owl (No. 25, Plate CXXI)" and "Strix Nyctea". On the lower left is written "Drawn from Nature by J. J. Audubon F.R.S.F.L.S."  "Engraved, Printed & Coloured by R.R.Havell, London" appears on the lower right.

Background publication history

Though Audubon typically used oil colours, for this piece he used watercolours and pastel crayons (and occasionally pencil, charcoal, chalk, gouache, and pen and ink). His first depiction of the snowy owl was done in pastels in 1809. The Snowy Owl was part of the original edition of The Birds of America (sometimes called the Havell Edition after its printer, and sometimes called the "Double Elephant Folio", because of its size). It was printed on handmade paper 39.5 inches tall by 28.5 inches wide (100.3 × 72.4 cm). The principal printing technique was copperplate etching, but engraving and aquatint were also used. Colourists applied each colour in an assembly-line fashion (over fifty were hired for the work). He was able to sell the Snowy Owl engravings to his wealthy patrons as part of The Birds of America.

Audubon described the snowy owl in his Ornithological Biographies, which he wrote with Scottish naturalist and ornithologist William MacGillivray. Part of his role as a naturalist was his examination of the stomach contents of owls. As was his habit, Audubon included his assessment of the owl's use as a food source. He stated that snowy owls were "not indelicate eating".

Critique 
One art historian described the piece, as an image that depicts the owls as "...gazing directly into the eyes of the observer." The owls stand out from their dark background, as a developing winter storm is seen behind them. Though Audubon depicted the birds perched on the branch of the tree, the owls do not typically use trees as perches since much of their hunting ground is tundra and lacks trees. The female bird is realistically displayed as being larger than the male.

Public exhibitions
The Snowy Owl engraving has displayed individually and as part of exhibitions of The Birds of America by the following organizations:
University of Michigan, Ann Arbor
Louisiana State University
University of Pittsburgh 
Teylers Museum
New-York Historical Society

Collections and archives
The Darlington Collection 
Meisei University
Trinity College

References

Bibliography
 Rhodes, Richard (2004). John James Audubon: The Making of an American. New York: Alfred A. Knopf.

External links
 Birds of America at the University of Pittsburgh — with high resolution images of all 435 double elephant folios.
 Meisei University: Birds of America — the complete sets of 435 plates of drawings, with the accompanying five volumes of textbooks.
 
Popular Science Monthly/Volume 31/September 1887/Sketch of J. J. Audubon

1831 works
19th-century engravings
.
.
Birds in art
Owls in culture